The Dancing Boys of Afghanistan is a 2010 documentary film produced by Clover Films and directed by Afghan journalist Najibullah Quraishi about the practice of bacha bazi in Afghanistan. The 52-minute documentary premiered in the UK at the Royal Society of Arts on March 29, 2010, and aired on PBS Frontline in the United States on April 20.

Bacha bazi, also known as bacchá (from the Persian bacheh بچه‌, literally "playing with boys" in Persian, Pashto and Hindustani), is a form of sexual slavery and child prostitution in which prepubescent and adolescent boys are sold to wealthy or powerful men for entertainment and sexual activities. This business thrives in Afghanistan, where many men keep dancing boys as status symbols. The practice is illegal under Afghan law.

References

External links

PBS Frontline Page
Clover Films Page
Ghaith Abdul-Ahad: The dancing boys of Afghanistan (The Guardian) 
Cynthia Fuchs: Frontline: The Dancing Boys of Afghanistan (PopMatters.com)
Jeremy Anderson: The Dancing Boys of Afghanistan (Illume.com)

2010 films
2010 documentary films
American documentary television films
2010s English-language films
2010s American films